

The ANF Les Mureaux 160T was a French touring monoplane first flown in October 1932. It was a two-seat high-wing monoplane powered by a  Renault 4Pb inline engine, it did not enter production.

Specification

References

1930s French civil utility aircraft
160
Abandoned civil aircraft projects
High-wing aircraft
Aircraft first flown in 1932